John Kent (21 June 1937 – 14 April 2003) was a New Zealand cartoonist who is best known as the author of the erotic and satirical Varoomshka comic strip in the English newspaper The Guardian during the 1970s.

Biography
Born in Oamaru, Kent was self-taught as an artist, influenced by Al Capp, creator of Li'l Abner. He worked principally in felt-tip pen on A4 paper. Kent emigrated to England in 1959, working in advertising before his Grocer Heath strip was published in Private Eye in 1969. Varoomshka appeared in The Guardian from 1969 to 1979, Kent also contributing work to The Sun, The Daily Mail, The Sunday Times and, from 1998, The Times, where his La Bimba strip showed clear echoes of the earlier Varoomshka.

Sources

External links
Michael McNay, "John Kent" obituary, The Guardian, 19 April 2003. 
Mark Bryant, Obituary from The Independent, 21 May 2003.
Biography from British Cartoon Archive, University of Kent
John Kent at lambiek.net

1937 births
2003 deaths
New Zealand cartoonists
New Zealand comics artists
New Zealand erotic artists
The Guardian journalists
Private Eye contributors
People from Oamaru